Alexis Vila Perdomo (born March 12, 1971) is a Cuban professional mixed martial artist. An accomplished wrestler, Vila is also a two-time World Champion and 1996 Olympic bronze medallist. At the 1996 Summer Olympics he won the bronze medal in the Freestyle Light Flyweight (– 48 kg) category.

Background
Born and raised in a rough neighborhood in Villa Clara, Cuba, Vila began getting into street fights from a young age. After winning multiple titles in wrestling and earning a bronze medal at the 1996 Summer Olympics in Atlanta, Georgia, Vila defected to the United States in 1997 and found a job coaching at Michigan State University where he worked with future UFC fighters Rashad Evans and Gray Maynard. In 2004, Vila accidentally crashed his car into Fort Lauderdale-Hollywood International Airport. Though no one was hurt, authorities mistakenly believed it to be attempted terrorism and Vila was charged with airport violence and sent to prison for three years. Upon his release, Vila began his career in mixed martial arts.

Mixed martial arts career

Bellator Fighting Championships
Vila made his Bellator debut by defeating Featherweight Champion Joe Warren in the quarterfinals of the Bantamweight tournament at Bellator 51. Vila next faced Marcos Galvao and won by controversial split decision.

In the finals, Vila faced Eduardo Dantas for the Season 5 Bellator Bantamweight Tournament Championship. He lost the fight via unanimous decision.

Vila's next fight was against Luis Nogueira in the Quarterfinals of the Season 6 Bantamweight Tournament. Vila lost via unanimous decision.

World Series of Fighting
Vila faced Josh Rettinghouse in a Bantamweight bout at World Series of Fighting 6: Burkman vs. Carl on October 26, 2013. He lost the fight via unanimous decision.

Vila faced Sidemar Honorio at WSOF 8. He won the bout via unanimous decision.

Vila then faced Brandon Hempleman at WSOF 12 on August 9, 2014. Vila lost via unanimous decision.

Other promotions
Vila faced Brazilian prospect Marcel Adur at Fight Time 23: Mayhem In Miami on February 6, 2015. He lost the fight via body kick TKO, suffering the first TKO loss of his career.

Personal life
He has a daughter in Cuba.  He married Adriana Vila Perdomo (née De La Cruz) in Miami on April 26, 2012, but later divorced. She is now married to fellow Cuban boxer Joel Casamayor. On April 23, 2018, Vila was arrested for charges including 2nd degree murder. In December 2019, he was sentenced to 15 years in prison following his conviction for his role in organizing the kidnapping, torture and murder of Camilo Salazar.

Mixed martial arts record

|-
| Win
| align=center | 15–7
| Jorge Calvo
| Decision (unanimous)
| Titan FC 40
| 
| align=center | 3
| align=center | 5:00
| Coral Gables, Florida, United States
|
|-
| Loss
| align=center | 14–7
| Abdiel Velazquez
| Decision (majority)
| Titan FC 39
| 
| align=center | 3
| align=center | 5:00
| Coral Gables, Florida, United States
|
|-
| Loss
| align=center | 14–6
| Marcel Adur
| TKO (body kick and punches)
| Fight Time 23 – Mayhem In Miami
| 
| align=center | 1
| align=center | 4:49
| Miami, Florida, United States
|
|-
| Loss
| align=center | 14–5
| Brandon Hempleman
| Decision (unanimous)
| WSOF 12
| 
| align=center | 3
| align=center | 5:00
| Las Vegas, Nevada, United States
|
|-
| Win
| align=center | 14–4
| Sidemar Honorio
| Decision (unanimous)
| WSOF 8
| 
| align=center | 3
| align=center | 5:00
| Hollywood, Florida, United States
| Flyweight bout
|-
| Loss
| align=center | 13–4
| Josh Rettinghouse
| Decision (unanimous)
| WSOF 6
| 
| align=center | 3
| align=center | 5:00
| Coral Gables, Florida, United States
| Bantamweight bout
|-
| Win
| align=center | 13–3
| Wascar Cruz
| Submission (guillotine choke)
| CFA – Fight Night 1
| 
| align=center | 1
| align=center | 2:12
| Miami, Florida, United States
|
|-
| Win
| align=center | 12–3
| Czar Sklavos
| Decision (unanimous)
| CFA 11: Kyle vs. Wiuff 2
| 
| align=center | 3
| align=center | 5:00
| Coral Gables, Florida, United States
|
|-
| Loss
| align=center | 11–3
| Joshua Sampo
| Submission (guillotine choke)
| CFA 9: Night of Champions
| 
| align=center | 5
| align=center | 2:26
| Coral Gables, Florida, United States
| For the inaugural CFA Flyweight Championship
|-
| Loss
| align=center | 11–2
| Luis Nogueira
| Decision (unanimous)
| Bellator 65
| 
| align=center | 3
| align=center | 5:00
| Atlantic City, New Jersey, United States
| 
|-
| Loss
| align=center | 11–1
| Eduardo Dantas
| Decision (unanimous)
| Bellator 59
| 
| align=center | 3
| align=center | 5:00
| Atlantic City, New Jersey, United States
| Bellator Season 5 Bantamweight Tournament Final
|-
| Win
| align=center | 11–0
| Marcos Galvão
| Decision (split)
| Bellator 55
| 
| align=center | 3
| align=center | 5:00
| Yuma, Arizona, United States
| Bellator Season 5 Bantamweight Tournament Semifinal
|-
| Win
| align=center | 10–0
| Joe Warren
| KO (punch)
| Bellator 51
| 
| align=center | 1
| align=center | 1:04
| Canton, Ohio, United States
| Bellator Season 5 Bantamweight Tournament Quarterfinal; Bantamweight Debut.
|-
| Win
| align=center | 9–0
| Lewis McKenzie
| TKO (punches)
| MFA: New Generation 4
| 
| align=center | 2
| align=center | 3:26
| Miami, Florida, United States
|
|-
| Win
| align=center | 8–0
| Omar Choudhury
| TKO (punches)
| MFA: New Generation 2
| 
| align=center | 2
| align=center | 2:50
| Miami, Florida, United States
|
|-
| Win
| align=center | 7–0
| Sean Hall
| TKO (punches)
| MFA: New Generation 1
| 
| align=center | 2
| align=center | 3:34
| Miami, Florida, United States
|
|-
| Win
| align=center | 6–0
| Cody Bell
| TKO (punches)
| G-Force Fights: Bad Blood 2
| 
| align=center | 2
| align=center | 0:54
| Coral Gables, Florida, United States
|
|-
| Win
| align=center | 5–0
| Ben Nguyen
| KO (punch)
| PFC: Best of Both Worlds
| 
| align=center | 2
| align=center | 0:34
| Lemoore, California, United States
|
|-
| Win
| align=center | 4–0
| Ian Wolf
| Submission (rear-naked choke)
| MFA: There Will Be Blood
| 
| align=center | 1
| align=center | 0:35
| Miami, Florida, United States
|
|-
| Win
| align=center | 3–0
| Ralph Acosta
| TKO (punches)
| G-Force Fights: Bad Blood 1
| 
| align=center | 1
| align=center | 1:00
| Miami, Florida, United States
|
|-
| Win
| align=center | 2–0
| Tyler Weathers
| Decision (unanimous)
| Warpath
| 
| align=center | 3
| align=center | 5:00
| Albuquerque, New Mexico, United States
|
|-
| Win
| align=center | 1–0
| Steven Nelson
| Submission (guillotine choke)
| Crazy Horse Fights
| 
| align=center | 2
| align=center | 3:52
| Fort Lauderdale, Florida, United States
|

References

External links  
 
 
 

1971 births
Living people
Wrestlers at the 1996 Summer Olympics
Cuban male sport wrestlers
Olympic wrestlers of Cuba
Olympic bronze medalists for Cuba
Cuban male mixed martial artists
Flyweight mixed martial artists
Bantamweight mixed martial artists
Mixed martial artists utilizing freestyle wrestling
Defecting sportspeople of Cuba
Cuban emigrants to the United States
Olympic medalists in wrestling
Medalists at the 1996 Summer Olympics
Pan American Games gold medalists for Cuba
Pan American Games medalists in wrestling
Wrestlers at the 1995 Pan American Games
Medalists at the 1995 Pan American Games
American people convicted of murder
People from Villa Clara Province